Luise Stäblein (born 15 September 1980) is a German rhythmic gymnast. She competed in the women's group all-around event at the 1996 Summer Olympics.

References

1980 births
Living people
German rhythmic gymnasts
Olympic gymnasts of Germany
Gymnasts at the 1996 Summer Olympics
Gymnasts from Berlin